Basic Basie is an album by pianist and bandleader Count Basie  featuring performances recorded in Chicago in 1969 and released on the MPS label. It was released in the U.S. in 1972 on the Groove Merchant label as Evergreens.

Reception

AllMusic awarded the album 3 stars.

Track listing
 "Idaho"  (Jesse Stone) - 2:19
 "Blues in My Heart" (Benny Carter, Irving Mills) - 2:53
 "I Don't Stand a Ghost of a Chance with You" (Victor Young, Ned Washington, Bing Crosby) - 3:55
 "Red Roses for a Blue Lady" (Sid Tepper,  Roy C. Bennett) - 2:52
 "Moonglow" (Will Hudson, Mills, Eddie DeLange) - 2:56
 "Ma! He's Making Eyes at Me" (Con Conrad, Sidney Clare) - 2:16
 "M-Squad" (Count Basie) - 2:18
 "Sweet Lorraine" (Cliff Burwell, Mitchell Parish) - 3:27
 "Ain't Misbehavin'" (Fats Waller, Harry Brooks. Andy Razaf) - 2:36
 "Don't Worry 'bout Me" (Rube Bloom, Ted Koehler) - 2:56
 "As Long as I Live" (Harold Arlen, Koehler) - 2:48
 "I've Got the World on a String" (Arlen, Koehler) - 2:47

Personnel 
Count Basie - piano
Oscar Brashear, Gene Coe, Sonny Cohn, Waymon Reed - trumpet 
Frank Hooks, Grover Mitchell, Mel Wanzo - trombone
Bill Hughes - bass trombone
Marshal Royal, Bobby Plater - alto saxophone 
Eric Dixon, Eddie "Lockjaw" Davis - tenor saxophone
Charlie Fowlkes - baritone saxophone
Freddie Green - guitar
Norman Keenan  - bass
Harold Jones - drums

References 

1969 albums
Count Basie Orchestra albums
MPS Records albums
Albums produced by Sonny Lester